This is a list of Japanese football transfers in the winter transfer window 2012–2013 by club.

J.League Division 1

Albirex Niigata 

In:

Out:

Kashima Antlers 

In:

Out:

Omiya Ardija 

In:

Out:

Shonan Bellmare 

In

Out

Cerezo Osaka 

In:

Out:

Yokohama F. Marinos 

In:

Out:

Kawasaki Frontale 

In

Out

Nagoya Grampus 

In:

Out:

Júbilo Iwata 

In:

Out:

Urawa Red Diamonds 

In

Out

Kashiwa Reysol 

In

Out

Shimizu S-Pulse 

In:

Out:

Sagan Tosu 

In

Out

Sanfrecce Hiroshima 

In

Out

Oita Trinita 

In

Out

FC Tokyo 

In

Out

Ventforet Kofu 

In

Out

Vegalta Sendai 

In

Out

J.League Division 2

Avispa Fukuoka 

In

Out

Consadole Sapporo 

In

Out

Ehime FC 

In

Out

Fagiano Okayama 

In

Out

Gainare Tottori 

In:

Out:

Gamba Osaka 

In:

Out:

FC Gifu 

In

Out

Giravanz Kitakyushu 

In

Out

Mito HollyHock 

In

Out

JEF United Chiba 

In

Out

Kataller Toyama 

In

Out

Montedio Yamagata 

In

Out

Roasso Kumamoto 

In

Out

Kyoto Sanga FC 

In

Out

Thespa Kusatsu 

In

Out

Tochigi SC 

In

Out

Tokyo Verdy 

In

Out

Tokushima Vortis 

In

Out

Matsumoto Yamaga 

In

Out

Vissel Kobe 

In:

Out:

V-Varen Nagasaki 

In

Out

Yokohama FC 

In

Out

References 

Transfers
Transfers
Japan
2012-13